Alimayya is a 1993 Indian Kannada-language romantic drama film written by Manivannan and directed by Kishore Sarja in his directorial debut. The film starred Arjun Sarja and Shruti. The film is a remake of 1987 Tamil film Kalyana Kacheri which was also an Arjun Sarja starrer. The film had a musical score by M. M. Keeravani and was produced by N. Kumar.

Cast
 Arjun Sarja
 Shruti
 Lokesh
 Silk Smitha
 Kovai Sarala
 Tennis Krishna
 Doddanna
 Rajanand
 Girija Lokesh
 M. S. Umesh

Soundtrack
All the songs are composed and scored by M. M. Keeravani with the lyrics by Doddarangegowda and Sriranga.

References

1993 films
1990s Kannada-language films
Kannada remakes of Tamil films
Indian romantic drama films
Films scored by M. M. Keeravani
1993 romantic drama films
Films directed by Kishore Sarja